The 1951 San Francisco State Gators football team represented San Francisco State College—now known as San Francisco State University—as a member of the Far Western Conference (FWC) during the 1951 college football season. Led by second-year head coach Joe Verducci, San Francisco State compiled an overall record of 8–2 with a mark of 2–0 in conference play, placing second in the FWC. For the season the team outscored by its opponents 246 to 167. The Gators played home games at Cox Stadium in San Francisco.

Schedule

Team players in the NFL
No San Francisco State players were selected in the 1952 NFL Draft.

The following finished their college career in 1951, were not drafted, but played in the NFL.

Notes

References

San Francisco State
San Francisco State Gators football seasons
San Francisco State Gators football